John van Reenen (26 March 1947 – 21 August 2018) was a South African graphic artist and discus thrower, who was best known for setting the world record in the men's discus event in 1975. He was drafted in the 14th round of the 1972 NFL Draft by the San Diego Chargers, despite never having played American Football.

Biography
John van Reenen was born on 26 March 1947 in Bethlehem, Free State, South Africa. As an athlete, his international competitive exposure was limited by the ban on South Africa from international games, imposed due to the apartheid regime at the time. He managed to compete overseas via representing his university Washington State University where he was pursuing his art studies on a scholarship (one of five offered to him) based on his athletics prowess. Van Reenen studied Fine Art throughout his athletics career, specialising in etchings.

In the 1970 season he twice broke the South African record while competing for WSU, but his major mark was in the spring of 1975, when on 14 March, at a meet in Stellenbosch, he threw 68.48m to set a new world record. He later won the British 3A's championship that year. Ten years on he won the South African national championships in 1985, 1986 and 1987.

Van Reenan became an artist and joined the studio of Jan Vermeiren. He lectured at the University of Stellenbosch his subject matter being Etchings. As an artist he found some success with his art having sold across the United States of America and throughout South Africa.

Van Reenen was inducted into the South African Sports Hall of Fame in February 2009 for his World Record Discus Throw.

References

External links
John van Reenen Online Art Gallery for further information about John van Reenen's athletics career and Art Career.
1975 Year Ranking

1947 births
2018 deaths
South African male discus throwers
World record setters in athletics (track and field)
White South African people
People from Bethlehem, Free State
Washington State Cougars men's track and field athletes
Washington State University alumni